Idichapuli Selvaraj ( – 30 January 2012) was a veteran Tamil comedy actor. He acted in more than five hundred films. He acted along with lot of actors. He also worked as an assistant director for the M. G. Ramachandran films like Idhayakkani and Ulagam Sutrum Valiban.

His brother Pandu was also a comedy actor as well as renowned artist.

Filmography 
This is a partial filmography. You can expand it.

1960s

1970s

1980s

1990s

2000s

Dubbing artist

References

External links 
 

Tamil comedians
Tamil male actors
Indian male film actors
2012 deaths
Indian Tamil people
1939 births
Indian male comedians
20th-century Indian male actors
Tamil male television actors